The WAGR Dd class was a class of 4-6-4T tank locomotive operated by the Western Australian Government Railways (WAGR) between 1946 and 1972.

History
The Dd type was an evolution of the Dm class. However unlike the Dm class which used components of the old E Class tender engines, the Dd class components were all new. All were built at the Midland Railway Workshops entering service between April and November 1946. They were built to haul suburban passenger services in Perth, although they did on occasions work to Bunbury on the South Western and Merredin on the Eastern lines.
The first were withdrawn in 1969, with the remainder in 1970/71 following the entry into service of the ADK/ADB class diesel multiple units.

Preservation
Two have been preserved:
Dd592 was preserved by the Australian Railway Historical Society in July 1972. In May 1984, Westrail commenced work at Midland Railway Workshops to restore it to operational condition as a Bicentennial project. It returned to service on 20 July 1985 and remained in service until August 1995. It became a static exhibit at the Western Australian Rail Transport Museum in May 1999. 
Dd596 was also purchased by the Australian Railway Historical Society in April 1974 and was placed on display at the Western Australian Rail Transport Museum. In July 1990 it was placed on display at the Gosnells Railway Market.

Class list
The numbers and periods in service of each member of the Dd class were as follows:

See also

Rail transport in Western Australia
List of Western Australian locomotive classes

References

Notes

Bibliography

External links

Railway locomotives introduced in 1946
Dmd WAGR class
3 ft 6 in gauge locomotives of Australia
4-6-4T locomotives
Passenger locomotives